Daku Maharani is a Hindi rape and revenge, dacoit film of Bollywood directed by Teerat Singh Johar and produced by Vimal Jain. This film was released in 2000 in the banner of Nishu Art.

Plot
Maharani is a young woman who was brutally raped by village leader Thakur. Thakur is very powerful and influential person who stigmatised her as a fallen woman. Maharani was sent out of the village, but then she takes revenge against Thakur.

Cast
 Kiran Kumar as Jagabatar
 Deepak Shirke as Chaudhari
 Joginder as Sarpanch
 Shiva Rindani
 Ishrat Ali
 Kamal Malik as Shambhu
 Romesh Goel as Police Commissioner
 Satnam Kaur as Rani
 Anil Nagrath as Lala
 Roma

References

External links
 

2000 films
2000s Hindi-language films
Indian action films
Indian rape and revenge films
Films about outlaws
Indian films about revenge
2000 action films
Hindi-language action films